Mount Cooper is a large mountain standing 4 nautical miles (7 km) west of Asman Ridge on the south side of Arthur Glacier, in the Ford Ranges of Marie Byrd Land in Antarctica. It was discovered on aerial flights in 1934 by the Byrd Antarctic Expedition, and named by Byrd for Merian C. Cooper, motion picture producer of Hollywood.

References 

Cooper, Mount